(Sanskrit: वैश्रवण) or  (Pali; , , , , ,  Thao Kuwen or  Thao Wetsuwan), is one of the Four Heavenly Kings, and is considered an important figure in Buddhism.

Names
The name  is a  derivative (used, e.g., for patronymics) of the Sanskrit proper name  from the root  "hear distinctly", (passive) "become famous". The name  is derived from the Sanskrit  which means "son of Vishrava", a usual epithet of the Hindu god Kubera.  is also known as Kubera and Jambhala in Sanskrit and Kuvera in Pāli.

Other names include:
 , a calque of Sanskrit 
 . This was a loanword from  into Middle Chinese with the addition of the word "heaven, god"
 , THL Namthöse, "Prince All-Hearing", a calque of Sanskrit 
   is a loan from Tibetan thos sras, a short form of Tibetan rnam thos sras with the addition of an honorific
  Thao Kuwen or  Thao Wetsuwan is an honorific plus the modern pronunciation of Pali Vessavaṇa.

Characteristics
Although brought into East Asia as a Buddhist deity,  has become a character in folk religion and has acquired an identity that is partially independent of the Buddhist tradition (cf. the similar treatment of Guanyin and Yama).

 is the guardian of the northern direction, and his home is in the northern quadrant of the topmost tier of the lower half of Sumeru. He is the leader of all the  who dwell on the Sumeru's slopes.

He is often portrayed with a yellow face. He carries an umbrella or parasol (chatra) as a symbol of his sovereignty.  He is also sometimes displayed with a mongoose, often shown ejecting jewels from its mouth. The mongoose is the enemy of the snake, a symbol of greed or hatred; the ejection of jewels represents generosity.

In Theravāda tradition 

In the Pāli Canon of Theravāda Buddhism,  is called .  is one of the Cāturmahārājika deva or "Four Great Heavenly Kings", each of whom rules over a specific direction. 's realm is the northern quadrant of the world, including the land of Uttarakuru.  According to some suttas, he takes his name from a region there called ; he also has a city there called Ālakamandā which is a byword for wealth.  governs the yakshas – beings with a nature between 'fairy' and 'ogre'.

's wife is named Bhuñjatī, and he has five daughters, Latā, Sajjā, Pavarā, Acchimatī, and Sutā.  He has a nephew called , a yakkha, husband of the nāga woman Irandatī.  He has a chariot called Nārīvāhana.  He is called gadāvudha (Sanskrit: gadāyudha) "armed with a club", but he only used it before he became a follower of the Buddha.

 has the name "Kuvera" from a name he had from a past life as a rich Brahmin mill-owner from Sri Lanka, who gave all the produce of one of his seven mills to charity, and provided alms to the needy for 20,000 years. He was reborn in the Cātummahārājikā heaven as a result of this good karma.

As with all the Buddhist deities,  is properly the name of an office (filled for life) rather than a permanent individual.  Each  is mortal, and when he dies, he will be replaced by a new .  Like other beings of the Cātummahārājika world, his lifespan is 90,000 years (other sources say nine million years).   has the authority to grant the yakkhas particular areas (e.g., a lake) to protect, and these are usually assigned at the beginning of a 's reign.

When Gautama Buddha was born,  became his follower, and eventually attained the stage of sotāpanna, one who has only seven more lives before enlightenment. He often brought the Buddha and his followers messages from the gods and other humans, and protected them.  He presented to the Buddha the  verses, which Buddhists meditating in the forest could use to ward off the attacks of wild yakkhas or other supernatural beings who do not have faith in the Buddha.  These verses are an early form of paritta chanting.

In the early years of Buddhism,  was worshipped at trees dedicated to him as shrines.  Some people appealed to him to grant them children.

In China 

In China, Vaiśravaṇa, also known as Píshāméntiān (毗沙門天), is one of the Four Heavenly Kings, and is he is considered to be a warrior god and protector of the north. He is also regarded as one of the Twenty Devas (二十諸天 Èrshí Zhūtiān) or the Twenty-Four Devas (二十四諸天 Èrshísì zhūtiān), a group of Buddhist dharmapalas who manifest to protect the Dharma. In Chinese Buddhist iconography, he holds a pagoda in his right hand and a trident in his left hand. In Chinese temples, he is often enshrined within the Hall of the Heavenly Kings (天王殿) with the other three Heavenly Kings. His name Duōwén Tiānwáng (多聞天王 lit. "listening to many teachings") is a reference to the belief that he guards the place where the Buddha teaches. In Taoist belief, he is conflated with the god Li Jing, whose iconography incorporates many of Vaiśravaṇa's characteristics, such as carrying a pagoda.

In Japan

In Japan, Bishamonten (毘沙門天), or just Bishamon (毘沙門) is thought of as an armor-clad god of war or warriors and a punisher of evildoers.  Bishamon is portrayed holding a spear in one hand and a small pagoda in the other hand, the latter symbolizing the divine treasure house, whose contents he both guards and gives away.  In Japanese folklore, he is one of the Seven Lucky Gods.

Bishamon is also called Tamonten (多聞天 lit. "listening to many teachings") because he is seen as the guardian of the places where the Buddha preaches. He is believed to live halfway down Mount Sumeru.  He is also associated with Hachiman. Especially in the Shingon tradition that gives some place and worth to this hybrid character of Bishamon although most Mahayana temples have Bishamon and his counterpart as guardians at the entrance gate.

In Tibet

In Tibet,  is considered a lokapāla or dharmapāla in the retinue of Ratnasambhava. He is also known as the King of the North.  As guardian of the north, he is often depicted on temple murals outside the main door.  He is also thought of as a god of wealth.  As such,  is sometimes portrayed carrying a citron, the fruit of the jambhara tree, a pun on another name of his, Jambhala.  The fruit helps distinguish him iconically from depictions of Kuvera. He is sometimes represented as corpulent and covered with jewels. When shown seated, his right foot is generally pendant and supported by a lotus-flower on which is a conch shell. His mount is a snow lion. Tibetan Buddhists consider Jambhala's sentiment regarding wealth to be providing freedom by way of bestowing prosperity, so that one may focus on the path or spirituality rather than on the materiality and temporality of that wealth.

In Thailand 
In Thailand, he resolves the dispute that arose in the legend of Nang Ai and Phadaeng. At Wat Chulamanee temple in Samut Songkhram Province, there is a huge statue of him that is very popular in worship, until becoming a phenomenon in the early 2022.

In popular culture
The 2011 manga Noragami, which revolves around Japanese mythology, depicts this deity's Japanese iteration Bishamonten as a lady possessing similar traits and equipped with modern weapons.

Bishamonten also made a depiction as a fighter of the Ragnarok, representing the Gods, in Record of Ragnarok.

See also
 Buddhism and violence
 Four Heavenly Kings
 Iron Man, Tibetan sculpture of Vaiśravaṇa carved from a meteorite
 Li Jing
 Pañcika, commander-in-chief, or general, of Vaiśravaṇa's Yakṣa army
 Seven Lucky Gods
 Hachiman -- Shinto God of War
 Uesugi Kenshin
 Vasudhara

References

 
Four Heavenly Kings
Lokapalas
Dharmapalas
Chinese gods
Japanese gods
War gods
Fortune gods
Yakshas
Twenty-Four Protective Deities